The 1988 United States presidential election in Nebraska took place on November 8, 1988. All 50 states and the District of Columbia, were part of the 1988 United States presidential election. Voters chose five electors to the Electoral College, which selected the president and vice president.

Nebraska was won by incumbent United States Vice President George H. W. Bush of Texas, who was running against Massachusetts Governor Michael Dukakis. Bush ran with Indiana Senator Dan Quayle as Vice President, and Dukakis ran with Texas Senator Lloyd Bentsen. Bush won Nebraska by a powerful 21% margin. His 60.15% vote share made it his seventh-best state in the nation, and one of only seven where he exceeded 60% of the vote. Even in this drought-influenced election, Nebraska remained largely immune to any significant softening of the Republican vote, as occurred in nearby, generally solidly Republican states at the time such as South Dakota, Montana, Colorado, and Kansas. 

The election was very partisan, with more than 99 percent of the electorate voting for either the Democratic or Republican parties, and only four candidates appearing on the ballot. As has been typical ever since the 1950s, nearly every county in Nebraska turned out a majority for the Republican Party. However, by carrying Saline County, which had long been the most Democratic county in the state, plus Dakota County and Thurston County in the northeast with their substantial Hispanic and Native American populations, Dukakis became the first Democrat to win any of Nebraska’s counties since Jimmy Carter in 1976, and the two northeastern counties went Democratic for the first time since Lyndon B. Johnson in 1964.

Nebraska weighed in for this election as 7% more Republican than the national average. As of the 2020 United States presidential election, this was the last time Nebraska has voted under a winner-take all system as it would start allocating its electoral votes in 1992.

Results

Results by county

See also
 United States presidential elections in Nebraska
 Presidency of George H. W. Bush

References

Nebraska
1988
1988 Nebraska elections